Mark Abma (born March 3, 1980) is a professional freeskier from Whistler Blackcomb, British Columbia. He has won numerous awards, including the Powder Video Award for Best Male Performance in 2007 and 2005. Abma was first known as a mogul and park skier, but moved on to the back country and heliskiing later in his career. He has been featured in many extreme skiing movies.

Projects
Recently, Mark has started up an advocacy group called One Step, whose goal is to help skiers and ski resorts reduce their carbon footprint.

Moreover, Abma helped Salomon to design their ski called the "Shogun".

Career achievements
Competition results: 
4th 2003 U.S Open Big Air 
5th 2003 U.S Open Slopestyle	

Awards
2010: Powder Video Awards - Best Natural Air (In Deep, Matchstick Productions)
2009: Powder Video Awards - Best Powder (Claim, Matchstick Productions)
2007: Powder Video Awards - Best Male Performance (Push, Matchstick Productions)
2005: Powder Video Awards - Best Male Performance (Yearbook, Matchstick Productions)

Filmography
Into The Mind (2013) by Sherpas Cinema
Superheroes of Stoke (2012) by Matchstick Productions (MSP) 
All.I.Can (2011) by Sherpas Cinema
Attack of la Niña (2011) by Matchstick Productions (MSP)
The Way I See It (2010) by MSP
In Deep: The Skiing Experience (2009) by MSP
Everyday Is Saturday (2009) by Poor Boyz Productions (PBP)
Claim (2008) by MSP
Reasons (2008) by PBP
Seven Sunny Days (2007) by MSP
Push (2006) by MSP
The Hit List (2005) by MSP
War (2005) by PBP
Session 51 (2005) by Warren Miller (WM)
Yearbook (2004) by MSP
Impact (2004) by WM
X = 10 (2004) by PBP
Ready, Fire, Aim (2003) by PBP
Focused (2003) by MSP
Abma appeared in over a dozen Salomon Freeski TV episodes.
Abma also appeared alongside Sean Pettit in the Red bull series "Keep your tips up"

References

Sportspeople from British Columbia
1980 births
Living people
Canadian male freestyle skiers
Freeskiers